Jan Holmlund (born 29 March 1957) is a Swedish ski jumper. He competed in the normal hill and large hill events at the 1980 Winter Olympics.

References

External links
 

1957 births
Living people
Swedish male ski jumpers
Olympic ski jumpers of Sweden
Ski jumpers at the 1980 Winter Olympics
Sportspeople from Norrbotten County